Linda Caron is a Canadian politician, who was elected to the National Assembly of Quebec in the 2022 Quebec general election. She represents the riding of La Pinière as a member of the Quebec Liberal Party.

References

21st-century Canadian politicians
21st-century Canadian women politicians
Quebec Liberal Party MNAs
Women MNAs in Quebec
French Quebecers
Living people
Year of birth missing (living people)